Antonio Monticini (1792–1854) was an Italian choreographer, ballet dancer, and composer who was active in major theatres throughout Italy during the first half of the 19th century.

References

1792 births
1854 deaths
Italian choreographers
Italian composers
Italian male composers
Italian male ballet dancers
19th-century Italian ballet dancers
19th-century Italian musicians
19th-century Italian male musicians